Mancoba is a surname. Notable people with the surname include:

Ernest Mancoba (1904–2002), South African sculptor, painter, and drawer
Sonja Ferlov Mancoba (1911–1984), Danish sculptor